Elmira Akhundova  (born 26 May 1953) is an Azerbaijani writer, publicist and politician. She has been a member of the Association of Azerbaijani Writers since 1983. She was elected to parliament in 2005.

Early life and education
Akhundova was born on 26 May 1953 in the Ramensk district of Moscow. Firstly she studied at school number 18 in Baku, then she went to a state school provided by Baky choreography college . After finishing school, she studied stenography at a technological city school. She graduated from the Azerbaijan University of Languages filology faculty in 1976.

Career

Writing
Akhundova began her career as a stenographer and then worked as an editor for the Committee of Azerbaijani Television and Radio broadcasting from 1977 until 1980. She published her first literary translation – The Heart of Najiba by Huseyn Ibrahimov – in 1978, and her first scientific article in 1979 in the Literaturnıy Azerbaydjan magazine.

Akhundova worked as a reviewer and adviser for the Federation of Azerbaijani Writers from 1980 until 1988. She was elected as secretary for the Azerbaijani Writers' Federation in 1991 and as a member of the State Forgiveness Commission in 1995.

Akhundova has been a docent of the translation theory and practise department at Baku Slavic University since 2002. Her compilation and translation Azerbaijan's young prose was published in 1984. Her other books include It is forgiven by rescript (in Russian) in 2000, A death of polygraphic worker in 2001, and Reality moment, Alovsat Guliyev: he was creating a history, This is us and Live time in 2003.

In 2009, her six volume official biography Heydar Aliyev: Personality and Epoch was released after a decade's research on the national leader.

Politics
In 2005, Akhundova became a member of parliament after running as an independent candidate in the election for District 71 in Masalli, winning with 29% of the vote over two ruling New Azerbaijan Party candidates. She became a member of the presidential Commission on Pardoning Issues.

Akhundova served as a member of Azerbaijan's delegation to the Parliamentary Assembly of the Council of Europe from 2006 to 2007.

She was appointed the Ambassador of Azerbaijan to Ukraine in March 2020 by the President Ilham Aliyev.

Awards and honors 
Akhundova received the H. Zardabi prize for her works. In 2003 she was awarded the Shohrat Order for "the development of popular writing." She was elected as a member of Milli Majlis in 2005.

Personal life
Akhundova is married to Ramiz Akhundov.And has a son Habib Akhundov

References

External links
 

Soviet translators
Azerbaijani translators
Soviet literary critics
Women literary critics
Soviet public relations people
Academic staff of Baku Slavic University
1953 births
Living people
Recipients of the Shohrat Order
Soviet women writers
Azerbaijani women ambassadors
Ambassadors of Azerbaijan to Ukraine
21st-century Azerbaijani women politicians
21st-century Azerbaijani politicians
Members of the National Assembly (Azerbaijan)
Women members of the National Assembly (Azerbaijan)
Independent politicians in Azerbaijan
Members of the 3rd convocation of the National Assembly (Azerbaijan)
Members of the 4th convocation of the National Assembly (Azerbaijan)
Members of the 5th convocation of the National Assembly (Azerbaijan)